Hopewell Township is a township in Cumberland County, in the U.S. state of New Jersey. It is part of the Vineland-Bridgeton metropolitan statistical area for statistical purposes. As of the 2020 United States census, the township's population was 4,391, a decrease of 180 (−3.9%) from the 2010 census count of 4,571, which in turn reflected an increase of 137 (+3.1%) from the 4,434 counted in the 2000 census.

Hopewell Township was first formed as a precinct on January 19, 1748, and was incorporated by an act of the New Jersey Legislature on February 21, 1798, as one of New Jersey's initial group of 104 townships. Portions of the township have been taken to form Columbia Township (March 12, 1844, returned to Hopewell Township on March 11, 1845), Cohansey Township (March 6, 1848) and Shiloh borough (April 9, 1929).

Geography
According to the United States Census Bureau, the township had a total area of 30.87 square miles (79.96 km2), including 29.89 square miles (77.42 km2) of land and 0.98 square miles (2.54 km2) of water (3.18%).

Unincorporated communities, localities and place names located partially or completely within the township include Bowentown, Cohansey, Dutch Neck, Harmony, Irlands Mills, Lakeside-Beebe Run, Mary Elmer Lake, Roadstown, and West Park.

The township borders the municipalities of Bridgeton, Fairfield Township, Greenwich Township, Shiloh, Stow Creek Township and Upper Deerfield Township in Cumberland County; and Alloway Township in Salem County.

Sunset Lake is a reservoir in Hopewell Township and Upper Deerfield Township covering  that was created by damming a stream that feeds to the area from above Seeley Lake and a stream that feeds into the lake from nearby Mary Elmer Lake.

Demographics

2010 census

The Census Bureau's 2006–2010 American Community Survey showed that (in 2010 inflation-adjusted dollars) median household income was $63,059 (with a margin of error of +/− $7,372) and the median family income was $72,520 (+/− $6,301). Males had a median income of $44,688 (+/− $5,244) versus $46,793 (+/− $8,187) for females. The per capita income for the borough was $27,355 (+/− $2,361). About 0.9% of families and 3.3% of the population were below the poverty line, including 2.7% of those under age 18 and 5.1% of those age 65 or over.

2000 census
As of the 2000 United States census there were 4,434 people, 1,628 households, and 1,206 families residing in the township. The racial makeup of the township was 87.10% White, 6.90% African American, 2.32% Native American, 0.56% Asian, 0.02% Pacific Islander, 1.44% from other races, and 1.65% from two or more races. Hispanic or Latino of any race were 3.59% of the population.

There were 1,628 households, out of which 30.2% had children under the age of 18 living with them, 60.6% were married couples living together, 9.2% had a female householder with no husband present, and 25.9% were non-families. 22.9% of all households were made up of individuals, and 12.9% had someone living alone who was 65 years of age or older. The average household size was 2.58 and the average family size was 3.03.

In the township the population was spread out, with 22.6% under the age of 18, 6.8% from 18 to 24, 24.5% from 25 to 44, 25.6% from 45 to 64, and 20.4% who were 65 years of age or older. The median age was 42 years. For every 100 females, there were 90.2 males. For every 100 females age 18 and over, there were 87.0 males.

The median income for a household in the township was $49,767, and the median income for a family was $59,675. Males had a median income of $40,774 versus $30,402 for females. The per capita income for the township was $22,783. About 3.8% of families and 6.6% of the population were below the poverty line, including 2.3% of those under age 18 and 17.7% of those age 65 or over.

Government

Local government
Hopewell Township is governed under the Township form of New Jersey municipal government, one of 141 municipalities (of the 564) statewide that use this form, the second-most commonly used form of government in the state. The Township Committee is comprised of five members, who are elected directly by the voters at-large in partisan elections to serve three-year terms of office on a staggered basis, with either one or two seats coming up for election each year as part of the November general election in a three-year cycle. At an annual reorganization meeting, the Township Committee selects one of its members to serve as Mayor and another as Deputy Mayor.

, members of the Hopewell Township Committee are Mayor Paul J. Ritter III (R, term on committee ends December 31, 2023; term as mayor ends 2022), Deputy Mayor Gregory J. Facemyer (R, term on committee and as deputy mayor ends 2022), Kelsey Bayzick (R, 2023), Roberta S. "Robin" Freitag (R, 2024) and Thomas J. Tedesco Jr. (R, 2024).

Federal, state and county representation 
Hopewell Township is located in the 2nd Congressional District and is part of New Jersey's 1st state legislative district. Prior to the 2011 reapportionment following the 2010 Census, Hopewell Township had been in the 3rd state legislative district.

Politics
As of March 2011, there were a total of 3,133 registered voters in Hopewell Township, of which 786 (25.1%) were registered as Democrats, 805 (25.7%) were registered as Republicans and 1,538 (49.1%) were registered as Unaffiliated. There were 4 voters registered as Libertarians or Greens.

In the 2012 presidential election, Republican Mitt Romney received 57.6% of the vote (1,188 cast), ahead of Democrat Barack Obama with 41.5% (856 votes), and other candidates with 0.9% (18 votes), among the 2,086 ballots cast by the township's 3,193 registered voters (24 ballots were spoiled), for a turnout of 65.3%. In the 2008 presidential election, Republican John McCain received 55.8% of the vote (1,248 cast), ahead of Democrat Barack Obama, who received 40.9% (913 votes), with 2,235 ballots cast among the township's 3,125 registered voters, for a turnout of 71.5%. In the 2004 presidential election, Republican George W. Bush received 59.4% of the vote (1,265 ballots cast), outpolling Democrat John Kerry, who received around 38.9% (828 votes), with 2,130 ballots cast among the township's 2,886 registered voters, for a turnout percentage of 73.8.

In the 2013 gubernatorial election, Republican Chris Christie received 65.4% of the vote (873 cast), ahead of Democrat Barbara Buono with 33.1% (442 votes), and other candidates with 1.4% (19 votes), among the 1,350 ballots cast by the township's 3,099 registered voters (16 ballots were spoiled), for a turnout of 43.6%. In the 2009 gubernatorial election, Republican Chris Christie received 52.9% of the vote (779 ballots cast), ahead of both Democrat Jon Corzine with 38.2% (563 votes) and Independent Chris Daggett with 5.5% (81 votes), with 1,472 ballots cast among the township's 3,095 registered voters, yielding a 47.6% turnout.

Education 
The Hopewell Township School District serves public school students in kindergarten through eighth grade at Hopewell Crest School. As of the 2020–21 school year, the district, comprised of one school, had an enrollment of 496 students and 36.0 classroom teachers (on an FTE basis), for a student–teacher ratio of 13.8:1. The Shiloh School was closed after the end of the 2006–2007 school year, and all students from Shiloh are being sent to the Hopewell Crest School as part of a sending/receiving relationship, accounting for nearly 10% of the Hopewell district's enrollment.

Public school students in ninth through twelfth grades attend Cumberland Regional High School, which also serves students from Deerfield Township, Fairfield Township, Greenwich Township, Shiloh Borough, Stow Creek Township and Upper Deerfield Township. As of the 2020–21 school year, the high school had an enrollment of 1,032 students and 78.5 classroom teachers (on an FTE basis), for a student–teacher ratio of 13.1:1. The high school district has a nine-member board of education. Board seats are allocated to the constituent municipalities based on population, with each municipality assigned a minimum of one seat; Hopewell Township has one seat on the board.

Students are also eligible to attend Cumberland County Technology Education Center in Vineland, serving students from the entire county in its full-time technical training programs, which are offered without charge to students who are county residents.

Transportation

New Jersey Route 49 is the main highway providing access to Hopewell Township. County Route 540 also traverses the northern portion of the township.

Notable people

People who were born in, residents of, or otherwise closely associated with Hopewell Township include:
 Bloomfield H. Minch (1864–1929), politician who served as President of the New Jersey Senate.
 H. Boyd Woodruff (1917–2017), soil microbiologist who discovered actinomycin and developed industrial production by fermentation of many natural products, including cyanocobalamin (a synthetic form of Vitamin B12), the avermectins and other important antibiotics

References

External links

Hopewell Township website
Cumberland County web page for Hopewell Township
Hopewell Crest School

School Data for the Hopewell Crest School, National Center for Education Statistics
Cumberland Regional High School

 
1748 establishments in New Jersey
Populated places established in 1748
Township form of New Jersey government
Townships in Cumberland County, New Jersey